The 2014 United States House of Representatives elections in California were held on Tuesday, November 4, 2014, with a primary election on June 3, 2014. Voters elected the 53 U.S. representatives from the state of California, one from each of the state's 53 congressional districts. The elections coincided with the elections of other offices, including a gubernatorial election.

Overview

By district
Results of the 2014 United States House of Representatives elections in California by district:

Districts

District 1 

The 1st district is based in inland Northern California and includes Chico and Redding. Republican Doug LaMalfa, who has represented the 1st district since 2013, won reelection.

District 2 

The 2nd district is based in California's North Coast and includes Eureka, San Rafael, Petaluma, and Ukiah. Democrat Jared Huffman, who has represented the 2nd district since 2013, won reelection.

District 3 

The 3rd district is based in north central California and includes Davis, Fairfield, and Yuba City. Democrat John Garamendi, who has represented the 3rd district since 2013 and previously represented the 10th district from 2009 to 2013, won reelection.

District 4 

The 4th district is based in east central California and includes Lake Tahoe, Roseville, and Yosemite National Park. The first debate in the race took place on October 13, 2014. Republican Tom McClintock, who has represented the 4th district since 2009, won reelection.

District 5 

The 5th district is based in the North Bay and includes Napa, Santa Rosa, and Vallejo. Democrat Mike Thompson, who has represented the 5th district since 2013 and previously represented the 1st district from 1999 to 2013, won reelection.

District 6 

The 6th district is based in north central California and includes Sacramento. Democrat Doris Matsui, who has represented the 6th district since 2013 and previously represented the 5th district from 2005 to 2013, won reelection.

District 7 

The 7th district is based in north central California and includes eastern Sacramento County. Democrat Ami Bera, who has represented the 7th district since 2013, won reelection.

Endorsements

Polling

District 8 

The 8th district is based in the eastern High Desert and includes Victorville and Yucaipa. Republican Paul Cook, who has represented the 8th district since 2013, won reelection.

District 9 

The 9th district is based in the Central Valley and includes the San Joaquin Delta and Stockton. Democrat Jerry McNerney, who has represented the 9th district since 2013 and previously represented the 11th district from 2007 to 2013, won reelection.

District 10 

The 10th district is based in the Central Valley and includes Modesto and Tracy. Republican Jeff Denham, who has represented the 10th district since 2013 and previously represented the 19th district from 2011 to 2013, won reelection.

Polling

 ^ internal poll for Michael Eggman campaign

District 11 

The 11th district is based in the East Bay and includes Concord and Richmond. Democrat George Miller, who has represented the 11th district since 2013 and previously represented the 7th district from 1975 to 2013, retired.

District 12 

The 12th district is based in the Bay Area and includes most of San Francisco. House Democratic Leader and former Speaker Nancy Pelosi, who has represented the 12th district since 2013 and previously represented the 8th district from 1993 to 2013 and the 5th district from 1987 until 1993, won reelection.

District 13 

The 13th district is based in the East Bay and includes Berkeley and Oakland. Democrat Barbara Lee, who has represented the 13th district since 2013 and previously represented the 9th district from 1998 to 2013, won reelection.

District 14 

The 14th district is based in the Bay Area and includes most of San Mateo County. Democrat Jackie Speier, who has represented the 14th district since 2013 and previously represented the 12th district from 2008 to 2013, won reelection.

District 15 

The 15th district is based in the East Bay and includes Hayward and Livermore. Democrat Eric Swalwell, who has represented the 15th district since 2013, won reelection.

District 16 

The 16th district is based in the Central Valley and includes Fresno and Merced. Democrat Jim Costa, who has represented the 16th district since 2013 and previously represented the 20th district from 2005 to 2013, won reelection.

District 17 

The 17th district is based in the Bay Area and includes Sunnyvale, Cupertino, Santa Clara, Fremont, and Milpitas. Democrat Mike Honda, who has represented the 17th district since 2013 and previously represented the 15th district from 2001 to 2013, won reelection.

Polling

District 18 

The 18th district is based in the Bay Area and includes Palo Alto, Redwood City, and Saratoga. Democrat Anna Eshoo, who has represented the 18th district since 2013 and previously represented the 14th district from 1993 to 2013, won reelection.

District 19 

The 19th district is based in the South Bay and includes most of San Jose. Democrat Zoe Lofgren, who has represented the 19th district since 2013 and previously represented the 16th district from 1995 to 2013, won reelection.

District 20 

The 20th district is based in the Central Coast and includes Monterey and Santa Cruz. Democrat Sam Farr, who has represented the 20th district since 2013 and previously represented the 17th district from 1993 to 2013, won reelection.

District 21 

The 21st district is based in the Central Valley and includes Hanford and parts of Bakersfield. Republican David Valadao, who has represented the 21st district since 2013, won reelection.

Polling

 ^ Internal poll for the NRCC

District 22 

The 22nd district is based in the Central Valley and includes Clovis, Tulare, and Visalia. Republican Devin Nunes, who has represented the 22nd district since 2013 and previously represented the 21st district from 2003 to 2013, won reelection.

District 23 

The 23rd district is based in the southern Central Valley and includes parts of Bakersfield. Republican House Majority Whip Kevin McCarthy, who has represented the 23rd district since 2013 and previously represented the 22nd district from 2007 to 2013, won reelection.

District 24 

The 24th district is based in the Central Coast and includes San Luis Obispo and Santa Barbara. Democrat Lois Capps, who has represented the 24th district since 2013 and previously represented the 23rd district from 2003 to 2013 and the 22nd district from 1998 to 2003, won reelection.

District 25 

The 25th district is based in northern Los Angeles County and includes Palmdale and Santa Clarita. Republican Howard "Buck" McKeon, who has represented the 25th district since 1993, retired.

Endorsements 

External Links
 Steve Knight campaign website
 Lee Rogers campaign website
 Tony Strickland campaign website
 Evan Thomas campaign website

District 26 

The 26th district is based in the southern Central Coast and includes Oxnard and Thousand Oaks. Democrat Julia Brownley, who has represented the 26th district since 2013, won reelection.

District 27 

The 27th district is based in the San Gabriel Foothills and includes Alhambra and Pasadena. Democrat Judy Chu, who has represented the 27th district since 2013 and previously represented the 32nd district from 2009 to 2013, won reelection.

District 28 

The 28th district is based in the northern Los Angeles suburbs and includes Burbank and Glendale as well as parts of central Los Angeles. Democrat Adam Schiff, who has represented the 28th district since 2013 and previously represented the 29th district from 2003 to 2013 and the 27th district from 2001 to 2003, won reelection.

District 29 

The 29th district is based in the northeastern San Fernando Valley. Democrat Tony Cardenas, who has represented the 29th district since 2013, won reelection.

District 30 

The 30th district is based in the western San Fernando Valley and includes Sherman Oaks. Democrat Brad Sherman, who has represented the 30th district since 2013 and previously represented the 27th district from 2003 to 2013 and the 24th district from 1997 to 2003, won reelection.

District 31 

The 31st district is based in the Inland Empire and includes San Bernardino and Rancho Cucamonga. Republican Gary Miller, who has represented the 31st district since 2013 and previously represented the 42nd district from 2003 to 2013 and the 41st district from 1999 to 2003, retired.

Endorsements 

External Links
 Pete Aguilar campaign website
 Joe Baca campaign website
 Paul Chabot campaign website
 Lesli Gooch campaign website
 Eloise Gomez Reyes campaign website
 Danny Tillman campaign website

District 32 

The 32nd district is based in the San Gabriel Valley and includes El Monte and West Covina. Democrat Grace Napolitano, who has represented the 32nd district since 2013 and previously represented the 38th district from 2003 to 2013 and the 34th district from 1999 to 2003, won reelection.

District 33 

The 33rd district is based in coastal Los Angeles County and includes Beverly Hills and Santa Monica. Democrat Henry Waxman, who has represented the 33rd district since 2013 and previously represented the 30th district from 2003 to 2013, the 29th district from 1993 to 2003, and the 24th district from 1975 to 1993, retired.

Endorsements

Polling

 ^ Internal poll for Wendy Greuel Campaign

External Links
 Elan Carr campaign website
 Wendy Greuel campaign website
 Ted Lieu campaign website
 David Kanuth campaign website
 Matt Miller campaign website
 Barbara Mulvaney campaign website
 Brent Roske campaign website
 Marianne Williamson campaign website

District 34 

The 34th district is based in central Los Angeles and includes Chinatown and Downtown Los Angeles. Democrat Xavier Becerra, who has represented the 34th district since 2013 and previously represented the 31st district from 2003 to 2013 and the 30th district from 1993 to 2003, won reelection.

District 35 

The 35th district is based in the Inland Empire and includes Fontana, Ontario, and Pomona. Democrat Gloria Negrete McLeod, who has represented the 35th district since 2013, retired.

External Links
 Christina Gagnier campaign website
 Norma Torres campaign website

District 36 

The 36th district is based in eastern Riverside County and includes Palm Springs. Democrat Raul Ruiz, who has represented the 36th district since 2013, won reelection.

District 37 

The 37th district is based in West Los Angeles and includes Crenshaw and Culver City. Democrat Karen Bass, who has represented the 37th district since 2013 and previously represented the 33rd district from 2011 to 2013, won reelection.

District 38 

The 38th district is based in the eastern Los Angeles suburbs and includes Norwalk and Whittier. Democrat Linda Sánchez, who has represented the 38th district since 2013 and previously represented the 39th district from 2003 to 2013, won reelection.

District 39 

The 39th district straddles the Los Angeles–Orange county border and includes Chino Hills, Diamond Bar, and Fullerton. Republican Ed Royce, who has represented the 39th district since 2013 and previously represented the 40th district from 2003 to 2013 and the 39th district from 1993 to 2003, won reelection.

District 40 

The 40th district is based in central Los Angeles County and includes Downey and East Los Angeles. Democrat Lucille Roybal-Allard, who has represented the 40th district since 2013 and previously represented the 34th district from 2003 to 2013 and the 33rd district from 1993 to 2003, won reelection.

District 41 

The 41st district is based in the Inland Empire and includes Moreno Valley, Perris, and Riverside. Democrat Mark Takano, who has represented the 41st district since 2013, won reelection.

Polling

District 42 

The 42nd district is based in the Inland Empire and includes Corona and Murrieta. Republican Ken Calvert, who has represented the 42nd district since 2013 and previously represented the 44th district from 2003 to 2013 and the 43rd district from 1993 to 2003, won reelection.

District 43 

The 43rd district is based in South Los Angeles and includes Hawthorne and Inglewood. Democrat Maxine Waters, who has represented the 43rd district since 2013 and previously represented the 35th district from 1993 to 2013 and the 29th district from 1991 to 1993, won reelection.

District 44 

The 44th district is based in south Los Angeles County and includes Carson, Compton, and San Pedro. Democrat Janice Hahn, who has represented the 44th district since 2013 and previously represented the 36th district from 2011 to 2013, won reelection.

District 45 

The 45th district is based in inland Orange County and includes Irvine and Mission Viejo. Republican John Campbell, who has represented the 45th district since 2013 and previously represented the 48th district from 2005 to 2013, retired.

District 46 

The 46th district is based in central Orange County and includes Anaheim and Santa Ana. Democrat Loretta Sanchez, who has represented the 46th district since 2013 and previously represented the 47th district from 2003 to 2013 and the 46th district from 1997 to 2003, won reelection.

District 47 

The 47th district includes Long Beach and parts of Orange County. Democrat Alan Lowenthal, who has represented the 47th district since 2013, won reelection.

District 48 

The 48th district is based in coastal Orange County and includes Huntington Beach. Republican Dana Rohrabacher, who has represented the 48th district since 2013 and previously represented the 46th district from 2003 to 2013, the 45th district from 1993 to 2003, and the 42nd district from 1989 to 1993, won reelection.

District 49 

The 49th district is based in northern San Diego County and includes Carlsbad and Oceanside. Republican Darrell Issa, who has represented the 49th district since 2003 and the 48th district from 2001 to 2003, won reelection.

District 50 

The 50th district is based in inland San Diego County and includes Escondido and Santee. Republican Duncan D. Hunter, who has represented the 50th district since 2013 and previously represented the 52nd district from 2009 to 2013, won reelection.

District 51 

The new 51st district runs along the border with Mexico and includes Imperial County and San Diego. Juan Vargas, who has represented the 51st district since 2013, won reelection.

District 52 

The 52nd district is based in coastal San Diego and includes La Jolla and Poway. Democrat Scott Peters, who has represented the 52nd district since 2013, won reelection.

Polling

District 53 

The 53rd district is based in Central San Diego and includes La Mesa and Lemon Grove. Democrat Susan Davis, who has represented the 53rd district since 2013 and previously represented the 49th district from 2001 to 2003, won reelection.

See also 

 2014 United States House of Representatives elections
 2014 United States elections

References

External links
U.S. House elections in California, 2014 at Ballotpedia
Campaign contributions at OpenSecrets

California
2014
United States House of Representatives